Makram is a coastal town on Kamaran Island in the Red Sea.

Populated places in Al Hudaydah Governorate
Populated coastal places in Yemen